Scott Higham is a Pulitzer Prize-winning member of The Washington Post's investigations unit. He graduated from Stony Brook University, with a B.A. in history and has a M.S. from the Columbia Graduate School of Journalism. Higham also earned an A.S. in criminal justice at Suffolk County Community College.

Career 
Higham worked at his school magazine, The Stony Brook Press, eventually becoming the Executive Editor. After graduation, in the early 1980s, he took his first job at the Allentown Morning Call. Higham worked for the  Miami Herald and later at The Baltimore Sun. In an interview at his alma mater, he recalled being the first reporter at the scene of the Oklahoma City bombing attack in 1995, saying, he "was able to be a witness to history.” In 2000, he began working as an investigative reporter with The Washington Post.

in 2004, Higham conducted numerous investigations for The Washington Post, including an examination of abuse at the Abu Ghraib prison, and waste and fraud in Homeland Security contracting. The Abu Ghraib investigation was a finalist for the 2005 Pulitzer Prize for National Reporting, and the series on contracting won the Investigative Reporters and Editors Award for largest newspapers. He has also conducted investigations into spending at Guantanamo Bay detention camp and conflicts of interests on Capitol Hill.

Higham, won numerous awards in 2018, with the staff of The Washington Post and 60 Minutes for a series of investigations into the causes of the opioid epidemic.

Higham and Sari Horwitz co-authored the book Finding Chandra: A True Washington Murder Mystery. The non-fiction book chronicles the 2001 disappearance of Washington, DC intern Chandra Levy, whose remains were found one year later in an isolated area of the city's  Rock Creek Park. The book was a 2011 finalist for an Edgar Award, sponsored by Mystery Writers of America.

Awards and recognition 

 1993 Finalist Pulitzer Prize for Spot News Reporting, with the staff of Miami Herald
 1994 Finalist Pulitzer Prize for Feature Writing, with the staff of The Miami Herald
 2001 Winner Investigative Reporters and Editors Award with the staff of The Washington Post, for exploring the deaths of children in D.C.
 2002 Winner Pulitzer Prize for Investigative Reporting, with the staff of The Washington Post, for a series that exposed the District of Columbia's role in the neglect and death of 229 children placed in protective care between 1993 and 2000, which prompted an overhaul of the city's child welfare system
 2002 Winner Heywood Broun Award, with the staff of The Washington Post, for "The District's Lost Children"
 2002 Winner Robert F. Kennedy Journalism Award (Grand Prize and Domestic Print), with the staff of The Washington Post, for "The District's Lost Children"
 2002 Associated Press Managing Editors Award 
 2005 Finalist Pulitzer Prize for National Reporting, with the staff of The Washington Post
 2005 Winner Investigative Reporters and Editors Award, with the staff of The Washington Post
 2012 Winner The Society of Professional Journalists, Sigma Delta Chi, with the staff of The Washington Post, for "Capitol Assets"
 2012 Winner Everett Dirksen Award for Distinguished Reporting of Congress, with the staff of The Washington Post
 2016 Winner Pulitzer Prize for National Reporting, with the staff of The Washington Post, for its revelatory initiative in creating and using a national database to illustrate how often and why the police shoot to kill and who the victims are most likely to be
 2016 Winner The Society of Professional Journalists, Sigma Delta Chi, with the staff of The Washington Post, for their investigative reporting on the DEA's lax regulation on opioid distribution
 2017 Winner The Society of Professional Journalists, Sigma Delta Chi, with the staff of The Washington Post and CBS News 60 Minutes, for "The Whistleblower" a joint investigation into how the Drug Enforcement Administration was hobbled in its attempts to hold Big Pharma accountable in the opioid epidemic
 2017 Winner George Polk Award, with the staff of The Washington Post, for uncovering connections between the Trump campaign officials and Russians
 2018 Winner Edward R. Murrow Award for Investigative Reporting, with CBS News 60 Minutes, for "Too Big to Prosecute"
 2018 Winner News and Documentary Emmy Award, with the staff of The Washington Post and CBS News 60 Minutes, for "The Whistleblower”, a joint investigation into how the drug industry triumphed over the DEA in its effort to combat the nation's opioid crisis, the deadliest drug epidemic in U.S. history
 2018 Winner the Hillman Prize for Broadcast Journalism, with the staff of The Washington Post and CBS News 60 Minutes, for "The Whistleblower" and "Too Big to Prosecute"
 2018 Winner the Peabody Award, with the staff of The Washington Post and CBS News 60 Minutes, for "The Whistleblower" the joint investigation into how the Drug Enforcement Administration was hobbled in its attempts to hold Big Pharma accountable in the opioid epidemic

Note: "The Whistleblower" and "Too Big to Prosecute" were also finalists for the Gerald Loeb Award and the Scripps Howard Journal Award.

References

The Washington Post journalists
American male journalists
Living people
Pulitzer Prize for Investigative Reporting winners
Year of birth missing (living people)